The Lublin coat of arms is one of the city symbols of Lublin, Poland. The coat of arms was established by the Lublin City Council on 8 July 2004.

The coat of arms depicts a silver goat with golden corrugated horns and golden hooves, placed in a red field facing to the right, climbing from green grass to a green wine bush.

Symbols
The goat and the vine were attributes of the goddess Venus (which means the fertility of nature), from whom Julia (according to a legend quoted by Wincenty Kadlubek), the founder of the city, originated. The goat is also a symbol of love and Christ. The red background symbolizes strength and power.

History
The oldest image of the Lublin coat of arms comes from a document dated 1401 with the seal of the Lublin City Council. The document itself probably dates back to the 14th century.

References 

Lublin
Lublin
Lublin